Sadhana Sthapak  is a former MLA member from Gadarwara District Narsinghpur Madhya Pradesh seat. She has been in the MLA from 1998 to 2003. She was defeated by Govind Singh Patel in the 2003 Election. In the 2008 Election she was elected again for Madhya Pradesh Legislative Assembly Election 2008. She is member of Indian National Congress

References

External links
Sadhana Sthapak website

 
  
  

Living people
People from Narsinghpur district
Madhya Pradesh MLAs 1998–2003
Madhya Pradesh MLAs 2008–2013
Indian National Congress politicians from Madhya Pradesh
20th-century Indian women politicians
20th-century Indian politicians
21st-century Indian women politicians
21st-century Indian politicians
Year of birth missing (living people)
Women members of the Madhya Pradesh Legislative Assembly